Condylostylus patibulatus is a species of long-legged fly in the family Dolichopodidae.

References

Sciapodinae
Articles created by Qbugbot
Insects described in 1823
Taxa named by Thomas Say